Carl Magnus Alexander Schulman (born 17 February 1976 in Hemmesdynge) is a Swedish author, journalist, blogger and television and radio personality.

His career started when he created the website Stureplan.se in 2005. The same year he had a reoccurring feature on the Swedish TV show Postkodmiljonären on TV4 alongside his brother Calle Schulman. Alex Schulman started a blog in 2006 and was hired by Aftonbladet shortly thereafter. He wrote blog posts, released books and later became show host. In 2012 he started the podcast Alex & Sigges podcast together with Sigge Eklund.

Biography
Alex Schulman is the son of television producer and journalist Allan Schulman and the television host Lisette Schulman (née Stolpe). He is also a maternal grandson of the author Sven Stolpe. He has two brothers: Carl Johan (Calle) and Niklas Schulman. Together with his brother Calle he runs the company Schulmangruppen ("The Schulman Group"). He also has four older half-siblings from his father's first marriage.

Alex Schulman was born in Skåne but lived in Uddeholm and Gröndal (Stockholm) before his family moved to Farsta. He studied film, literary science and philosophy at Stockholm University.

Private life 
Alex Schulman is since 2010 married to Amanda Schulman (née Widell), and the couple have  two daughters and one son together. Schulman has been married twice before, to Katrin Zytomierska and Olivia Rieke.

Media 
Magazines

Schulman started as a film critic for the local newspaper Södersvepet. He later worked for Se & Hör and held a translating position for SDI media. Since July 2016 Alex writes weekly columns for Expressen.

Websites and blogs

Between 2005 and 2007 Schulman was the chief editor of the website www.stureplan.se. Schulman wrote a blog for Aftonbladet which he canceled on October 1, 2007.

On April 1, 2008, Alex and Calle Schulman started the website 1000 apor, which was announced bankrupt due to lacking profitability on June 17, 2009. They described themselves as having “Sweden’s biggest humor site”, but on his private blog Alex mixed humor with general topics as well as politics.

Between 2009 and 2010 Schulman authored the blog Att vara Charlie Schulmans pappa (To be Charlie Schulman's father) which had 200 000 weekly readers.

TV, radio and podcasts

Between 2009 and 2011 Schulman hosted his first talk show, Schulman Show, which broadcast through Aftonbladet's website. In 2012 the show was picked up by television and aired on Swedish channel 5. In the fall of 2010 Schulman hosted Paradise Hotel.

Schulman participated in the radio show Äntligen morgon med Adam & Gry on Mix Megapol on a weekly basis, with the feature "Fönster mot mediavärlden” (A window to the world of media) between 2006 and 2015.

In 2012 Schulman created the podcast Alex & Sigges podcast together with the writer Sigge Eklund. The podcast won Best Original Channel as well as Best Swedish Channel in Svenska podradiopriset (The Swedish Podcast radio Awards) in 2012.

Literature

In April 2009 Schulman released the book Hurry to Love, a novel dedicated to his father Allan Schulman, who died in 2003. In January 2011 Schulman released To Be With Her, a tribute to his wife Amanda Schulman. In 2016 Forget Me was released, a book where he tells the reader about his search for reconciliation with his alcoholic mother. At the Swedish Book Fair in Gothenburg Forget Me was named Book of the Year 2017.  

Stage shows

In 2012 Schulman made his stage debut with the show “Älska Mig” (Love Me), a show that tackled the need for affirmation in contemporary society. In 2015 Schulman and Sigge Eklund made the show “Meningen med Livet” (The Meaning of Life) for Cirkus in Stockholm, a show that later toured the country. January 26, 2017 their second show “LIVE” premiered at Rival in Stockholm.

Bibliography
 2007 – Privat: mejlkorrespondens (together with Carolina Gynning), Damm, 
 2009 – Hurry to Love, Forum, 
 2010 – Bajsfesten, Rabén & Sjögren, 
 2011 – To Be With Her, Piratförlaget, 
 2015 – Tid: livet är inte kronologiskt (together with Sigge Eklund), Bookmark Förlag, 
 2016 – Forget Me, Bookmark förlag, 
 2017 – Rum: en roadtrip genom psyket (together with Sigge Eklund), Bookmark Förlag, 
 2018 – Burn All My Letters, Bookmark Förlag, 
 2020 – The Survivors, Albert Bonniers Förlag. Libris link.

TV-programmes 
 Äntligen Hi-Tech  on TV4
 Veckans kanin on TV3 (host)
 Paradise hotel (fall 2010) on TV6 (host)
  Schulman show on Kanal 5 and via Aftonbladet's webb-TV

Theatre

Director

References

External links

 , website and blog

1976 births
Living people
Writers from Stockholm
Swedish nobility
Swedish journalists
Swedish bloggers
Swedish socialites
Swedish columnists
Online journalists
Swedish people of Walloon descent